João Ricardo Cardoso Benta (born 21 December 1986) is a Portuguese former cyclist, who competed as a professional from 2009 to 2022.

Major results

2008
 1st Overall Volta a Portugal do Futuro
2015
 1st Overall Troféu Joaquim Agostinho
1st Stage 1
1st  Points classification
1st  Mountains classification
2016
 4th Overall Troféu Joaquim Agostinho
1st Stage 1
 9th Overall Volta Internacional Cova da Beira
2017
 3th Overall Vuelta a Asturias
 6th Overall Volta Internacional Cova da Beira
 7th Overall Volta a Portugal
2018
 5th Overall Troféu Joaquim Agostinho
 6th Overall Volta a Portugal
 10th Time trial, National Road Championships
2019
 6th Overall Volta a Portugal
1st Stage 8
2020
 5th Overall Volta a Portugal
 7th Overall Troféu Joaquim Agostinho

References

External links
 
 
 

1986 births
Living people
Portuguese male cyclists